John Carter, Warlord of Mars is a role-playing game published by Heritage Models, Inc. in 1978.

Description
John Carter, Warlord of Mars is a science-fantasy system based on Edgar Rice Burroughs's novels of  Barsoom, a Mars ruled by various humanoid warrior races that fight with sword and gun. Although it mainly consists of man-to-man combat rules for use with miniatures (as they were published to support a line of Barsoomian figures), it does include some rules for role-playing.

Publication history
John Carter, Warlord of Mars was designed by Michael S. Matheny, with a cover by Russ Manning, and published by Heritage Models, Inc. in 1978 as a 64-page book.

There were at least two printings with different interior layout but both had a copyright date of 1978. One had a full color cover and one had a red tinted cover.

Reception
John J. Nutter reviewed John Carter, Warlord of Mars in The Space Gamer No. 24. Nutter commented that "Mr. Matheny has built a sound combat system and role-playing game which captures much of the flavor of the novels."

In his 1991 book Heroic Worlds: A History and Guide to Role-Playing Games, Lawrence Schick called the rules "poorly organized" and commented that "Players unfamiliar with the concepts of role-playing games would probably be unable to use them."

See also
 The Warlord of Mars, by Edgar Rice Burroughs

References

Barsoom
Heritage Models games
Role-playing games based on novels
Role-playing games introduced in 1978
Science fantasy role-playing games